Thomas Lee may refer to:

Arts and entertainment
 Thomas Lee (1794–1834), English architect
 Thomas Stirling Lee (1857–1916), English sculptor
 Thomas Oboe Lee (born 1945), Chinese-American composer
 Alias used by Walter Hill when directing the 2000 film Supernova.

Business
 Thomas Peter Lee (1871–1939), American co-founder and president of the Farmers Petroleum Company
 Thomas H. Lee (businessman) (1944–2023), American pioneer in private equity and leveraged buyouts
 Thomas H. Lee Partners, an American private equity firm
 Thomas Lee (analyst) American financial analyst and businessman

Politics

United Kingdom
Thomas Lee (fl.1385-1404), MP for Shropshire in 1385 and 1390
Thomas Lee (died 1391), MP for Hertfordshire in 1386
Thomas Lee (fl. 1420s), MP for Newcastle-under-Lyme in 1420 and 1427
Thomas Lee (by 1492-?1539/44), MP for Winchester in 1539
Thomas Lee (died 1545), MP for Hindon and Wilton
Thomas Lee (died 1556), MP for Thirsk
Thomas Lee (died 1572), MP for Banbury
Sir Thomas Lee, 1st Baronet (1635–1691), MP for Aylesbury
Sir Thomas Lee, 2nd Baronet (1661–1702), MP for Aylesbury
Sir Thomas Lee, 3rd Baronet (1687–1749), MP for Buckinghamshire

United States
 Thomas Lee (Virginia colonist) (1690–1750), colonial Virginia politician
Thomas Ludwell Lee (1730–1778), of the 1776 Virginia convention
Thomas Sim Lee (1745–1819), American planter and statesman of Frederick County, Maryland
Thomas Lee (New Jersey politician) (1780–1856), US Congressman from New Jersey

Other countries
Thomas Lee (notary) (1783–1832), notary and politician in Lower Canada
Lee Tung-hao (born 1955), Taiwanese economist and politician, also known as Thomas Lee

Other people
 Thomas Lee (army captain) (1552/3–1601), English army captain who served under Elizabeth I
 Thomas Lee (South Carolina judge) (1769–1839), United States federal judge
 Thomas Lee (footballer) (1876–?), English professional footballer
 Thomas Lee (clergyman), clergyman and English administrator at the University of Oxford
 Thomas H. Lee (power engineer) (1923–2001), Chinese-American power engineering professor at MIT
 Thomas H. Lee (electronic engineer), Korean-American electronic engineering professor at Stanford University
 Thomas Hong-Chi Lee (born 1945), Taiwanese-American historian
 Thomas E. Lee (1914–1982), archaeologist for the National Museum of Canada
 Thomas Rex Lee (born 1964), Utah Supreme Court justice
 T. Jack Lee (born 1935), director of the NASA Marshall Space Flight Center in Huntsville, Alabama

See also 
 Lee (English surname)
 Thomas Leigh (disambiguation)
 Tommy Lee (disambiguation)